The Right Honourable (abbreviation: Rt Hon. or variations) is an honorific style traditionally applied to certain persons and collective bodies in the United Kingdom, the former British Empire and the Commonwealth of Nations. The term is predominantly used today as a style associated with the holding of certain senior public offices in the United Kingdom, Canada, New Zealand, and to a lesser extent, Australia.

Right in this context is an adverb meaning 'very' or 'fully'. Grammatically, The Right Honourable is an adjectival phrase which gives information about a person. As such, it is not considered correct to apply it in direct address, nor to use it on its own as a title in place of a name; but rather it is used in the third person along with a name or noun to be modified.

Right may be abbreviated to Rt, and Honourable to Hon., or both. The is sometimes dropped in written abbreviated form, but is always pronounced.

Countries with common or current usage

United Kingdom

Entitlement

According to the British government, the following persons are entitled to be styled Right Honourable:

 Members of the Privy Council
 The Privy Council is notionally the body of formal advisors to the sovereign. Members of the Cabinet, senior politicians, and some few other officials are appointed as members for life, and are personally entitled to be styled Right Honourable thereafter.
 Peers below the rank of marquess
 Earls and countesses, viscounts and viscountesses and barons and baronesses who hold a substantive title (whether hereditary or life) are personally entitled to the style Right Honourable. A peer's wife or widow also has a legal right to the style of her husband.
 The lord mayors and lord provosts of certain cities (ex officio)
 The lord mayors of London, Cardiff, Belfast, Bristol and York and the lord provosts of Edinburgh and Glasgow are styled Right Honourable while in office.

Privy counsellors

Privy counsellors are appointed by the sovereign on the advice of the prime minister, and remain members for life unless they resign or are expelled. In practice, membership of the privy council is granted to:

 all members of the Cabinet (itself technically a committee of the Privy Council), and certain other senior ministers in the government;
 senior members of the Shadow Cabinet, the leaders of the major political parties in parliament, and the Speaker of the House of Commons;
 the first ministers of Scotland, Wales and Northern Ireland, and the leader of the largest opposition party in the Scottish Parliament;
 the two archbishops of the Church of England, who sit in the House of Lords ex officio;
 senior judges, who fulfil the judicial functions of the Privy Council;
 senior representatives of the Commonwealth nations; and
 senior members of the Royal Family.

A large proportion of the former and current prominent politicians of the United Kingdom are thus entitled to be styled Right Honourable.

No new appointments have been made to the Privy Council of Northern Ireland since 1971, but surviving appointed members remain entitled to the style. Non-British Commonwealth-citizen judges appointed to the Judicial Committee of the Privy Council are also entitled to the style, although the appellation may be ignored in the judge's home country.

It is the current practice of the House of Lords and the College of Arms to apply the style Right Honourable to privy counsellors only.

Peers

All holders of a substantive peerage below the rank of marquess are entitled to be styled Right Honourable, as are their wives and widows. However, a peer's heir who uses a courtesy title is not accorded the corresponding style. Peers above the rank of earl are entitled to different styles: dukes and duchesses are styled The Most Noble or His or Her Grace, and marquesses and marchionesses are styled as The Most Honourable.

In order to differentiate peers who are also members of the Privy Council—and therefore entitled to a style in both capacities—from peers who are not, the post-nominal letters  can be used to identify the privy counsellors. This applies to peers of all rank, as a holder of a dukedom or marquessate who becomes a Privy Counsellor retains their higher style and so could not be identified without the letters. In practice, in contexts where there might be confusion, official publications use the style Right Honourable exclusively to identify privy counsellors.

Lord mayors, lord provosts and other officers

The lord mayors of London, Cardiff, Belfast and York; and the lord provosts of Edinburgh and Glasgow are all entitled to be styled Right Honourable while in office. The lord mayors of Belfast and Cardiff are so entitled by an explicit grant from the sovereign, and the others through ancient custom. The style is used with the name of the office, not the personal name of the office-holder, e.g. "The Right Honourable Lord Mayor of London" or "The Right Honourable the Lord Provost of the City of Edinburgh".

Other lord mayors may be styled Right Worshipful, and other lord provosts do not use a style. By the 1920s, a number of city mayors, including the Lord Mayor of Leeds, were unofficially using the style Right Honourable, and the matter was consequently raised in parliament. The Lord Mayor of Bristol at present still uses the style Right Honourable, without official permission. In guidance issued in June 2003, the Crown Office recommended that the lord provosts of Aberdeen and Dundee be styled Right Honourable in the same manner as those of Edinburgh and Glasgow.

The Chairman of the London County Council (LCC) was granted the style in 1935 as part of the celebrations of the silver jubilee of King George V. The Chairman of the Greater London Council (GLC), the body that replaced the LCC in 1965, was similarly granted the style until the GLC was abolished in 1986.

Right Honourable is also used as a style by the Lord Lyon King of Arms in office, preceding his title rather than his personal name, as with other applications ex officio.

In the House of Commons

In the chamber of the House of Commons, members are not permitted to address each other directly, nor to name other members, but must instead address the speaker and refer to other members indirectly. This practice is intended to enforce a polite tone to maintain order and good honour. Members generally refer to one another as "my honourable friend" if in the same party, and "the honourable gentleman/lady/member" otherwise. If needed, constituencies ("the honourable member for...") or ministerial offices (e.g. "my honourable friend the prime minister") can be used for clarity.

Referring to one another as honourable is merely a courtesy used within the House, and is not a style used outside the chamber. However, when a member is in fact entitled to be styled Right Honourable (in practice always through membership of the Privy Council), they are referred to as such in the chamber. Further embellishments are traditionally applied to clergy (reverend), military officers (gallant) and barristers (learned), a practice recommended to be abolished following a 2010 report of the Modernisation Committee but in practice continued. In summary:
 "Honourable" is used for members who are not privy counsellors.
 "Right honourable" is used for members who are privy counsellors.
 "(Right) honourable and reverend" may be used for clergy.
 "(Right) honourable and gallant" may be used for military officers.
 "(Right) honourable and learned" may be used for barristers.

Collective entities

Right Honourable is added as a prefix to the name of various collective entities, including:
 "The Right Honourable the Lords Spiritual and Temporal in Parliament Assembled", i.e. the House of Lords.
 "The Right Honourable the Knights, Citizens and Burgesses in Parliament Assembled", i.e. the House of Commons.
 "The Right Honourable the Lords of the Privy Council", i.e. the Privy Council
 "The Right Honourable the Lords Commissioners of the Admiralty", i.e. the former Board of Admiralty

Canada

In Canada, occupants of only the three most senior public offices are styled as Right Honourable ( in French). Formerly, this was by virtue of their appointment to the Privy Council of the United Kingdom. However, Canadian appointments to the British Privy Council were ended by the government of Lester Pearson. Currently, individuals who hold, or have held, one of the following offices are awarded the style of Right Honourable for life:

 Governor General of Canada
 Prime Minister of Canada
 Chief Justice of Canada

The Right Honourable is not to be confused with His or Her Excellency, used by governors general during their term of office, or The Honourable, used only while in office by provincial premiers and cabinet ministers, and for life by senators and members of the King's Privy Council for Canada (chiefly cabinet ministers, as well as other figures such as party leaders or provincial premiers who may be appointed from time to time).

The title may also be granted for life by the Governor General to eminent Canadians who have not held any of the offices that would otherwise entitle them to the style. This has been done on two occasions: to eight prominent political figures to mark the 125th anniversary of Canadian Confederation in 1992, and to longtime Member of Parliament Herb Gray upon his retirement in 2002.

Over the years, a number of prominent Canadians became members of the Privy Council of the United Kingdom and thus were entitled to use the style Right Honourable, either because of their services in Britain (e.g. serving as envoys to London) or as members of the Imperial War Cabinet, or due to their prominence in the Canadian Cabinet. These included all but three of Canada's early prime ministers (Alexander Mackenzie, John Abbott, and Mackenzie Bowell), who governed before the title was used domestically.

New Zealand

Previously in New Zealand the prime minister and some other senior cabinet ministers were customarily appointed to the Privy Council of the United Kingdom and thus styled Right Honourable.

In her resignation honours, the former prime minister Helen Clark did not recommend the appointment of any new privy counsellors. In 2009 it was announced that her successor, John Key, had decided not to make any further recommendations to the Crown for appointments to the Privy Council.

In August 2010, the Queen of New Zealand announced that, with immediate effect, individuals who hold, and those persons who after the date of the signing of these rules are appointed to, the following offices are awarded the style Right Honourable for life:
 the Governor-General of New Zealand
 the Prime Minister of New Zealand
 the Chief Justice of New Zealand
 the Speaker of the New Zealand House of Representatives

This change was made because the practice of appointing New Zealanders to the Privy Council of the United Kingdom had ceased. However, the change had little immediate effect, as all but two of the holders or living former holders of the offices granted the style had already been appointed to the Privy Council.

The living New Zealanders holding the style Right Honourable as a result of membership of the Privy Council are:
 Sir Geoffrey Winston Russell Palmer (1985) — prime minister
 Jonathan Lucas Hunt (1989) — cabinet minister
 Sir Michael Hardie Boys (1989) — governor-general
 Helen Elizabeth Clark (1990) — prime minister
 James Brendan Bolger (1991) — prime minister
 Sir Donald Charles McKinnon (1992) — deputy prime minister
 Sir William Francis Birch (1992) — cabinet minister
 Sir John Steele Henry (1996) — court of appeal justice
 Sir Edmund Walter Thomas (1996) — supreme court justice
 Dame Jennifer Mary Shipley (1998) — prime minister
 Winston Raymond Peters (1998) — deputy prime minister
 Sir Douglas Arthur Montrose Graham (1998) — cabinet minister
 Sir Kenneth James Keith (1998) — court of appeal justice
 Sir Peter Blanchard (1998) — supreme court justice
 Sir Andrew Patrick Charles Tipping (1998) — supreme court justice
 Wyatt Beetham Creech (1998) — deputy prime minister
 Dame Sian Seerpoohi Elias (1999) — chief justice
 Simon David Upton (1999) — cabinet minister

The living New Zealanders holding the style The Right Honourable for life as a result of the 2010 changes are:

East Africa

During the periods of its existence, the Prime Minister of Kenya was styled Right Honourable. The prime ministers of Namibia and Uganda are both currently styled with the same honorific. The speaker and deputy speaker of the Parliament of Uganda are also entitled to the style.

Caribbean

The prime ministers of Grenada, Saint Lucia, Saint Vincent and the Grenadines and Trinidad and Tobago are styled as Right Honourable. The West Indies Federation prime minister was also styled as such during that office's short existence.

Nepal

In Nepal, the president, speaker of the House of Representatives, prime minister and chief justice of the Supreme Court are formally styled Right Honourable. Ministers, members of parliament (Lower and Upper Houses and provincial parliaments) and Chief ministers of provinces are styled "Honourable" only. It is usually joked during informal discussions about the use of the word "Honourable" to differentiate senior and less senior government dignitories. It can also be spelled in English as The Rt. Hon’ble.

South Korea
In South Korea, the President, Prime Minister, Speaker of the National Assembly and Chief Justice can use the Right Honourable style.

Countries with rare or historic usage

Australia

In Australia, the lord mayors of Adelaide, Brisbane, Hobart, Melbourne, Perth and Sydney are entitled to be styled Right Honourable while in office.

Historically, a number of Australians were entitled to the style as members of the Privy Council of the United Kingdom. Appointment to the Australian equivalent of the Privy Council, the Federal Executive Council, does not entitle a person to the style. Typical appointees to the Imperial Privy Council included senior politicians and judges at state and federal level. Malcolm Fraser in 1976 was the most recent prime minister to accept appointment to the Privy Council and thus to be styled Right Honourable. Of his 21 predecessors, only four were not members of the Privy Council – Alfred Deakin (declined appointment), Chris Watson (never offered), Arthur Fadden (accepted after leaving office), and Gough Whitlam (declined appointment). The last Governor-General to be entitled to the style was Sir Ninian Stephen, who left office in 1988. The last active politician to be entitled to the style was Ian Sinclair, who retired in 1998. The few Australian recipients of British peerages were also entitled to the style.

Present-day Australian governments no longer recommend Australians for elevation to the peerage or appointment to the Privy Council. However, some present-day Australian citizens either hold hereditary peerages (e.g. Malcolm Murray, 12th Earl of Dunmore) or have been awarded life peerages on the recommendation of the UK government (e.g. Trixie Gardner, Baroness Gardner of Parkes).

Ireland

Members of the Privy Council of Ireland were entitled to be styled Right Honourable, even after the Privy Council ceased to have any functions or to meet on the creation of the Irish Free State in December 1922. Nevertheless, the Lord Mayor of Dublin, like some of his counterparts in Great Britain, retained the use of the honorific style as a result of its having been conferred separately by legislation; in 2001 it was removed, as a consequence of local government law reform.

Sri Lanka

Ceylonese appointees to the privy council included D. S. Senanayake and Sir John Kotelawala.

See also

 The Honourable
 The Much Honoured
 The Most Honourable
 Style (manner of address)

Notes

References

Sources

External links

 Privy Council members

Styles (forms of address)